David John Collier MM ( – 30 November 1972) was a Welsh semi-professional football inside right who played in the Football League for Grimsby Town. He finished his career with Barry, playing more than 65 times for the club. He scored on his only cap for Wales, in a 2–1 British Home Championship win over Scotland on 12 February 1921.

Personal life 
Collier served in the Welsh Regiment during the First World War and was awarded the Military Medal for an act of heroism at Mametz Wood during the Battle of the Somme in July 1916. He suffered shrapnel wounds to the leg during the engagement.

See also
 List of Wales international footballers (alphabetical)

References

1894 births
Welsh footballers
Wales international footballers
Grimsby Town F.C. players
1972 deaths
People from Llwynypia
Sportspeople from Rhondda Cynon Taf
Association football inside forwards
English Football League players
Mid Rhondda F.C. players
Llanelli Town A.F.C. players
Barry Town United F.C. players
Southern Football League players
British Army personnel of World War I
Welch Regiment soldiers
Recipients of the Military Medal